"Talk Dirty" is a song by English musician John Entwistle, the former bassist for The Who. It was released in September 1981 as a single from his fifth solo studio album, Too Late the Hero (1981), on which he is also joined by guitarist Joe Walsh (who was a member of three commercially successful bands such as the James Gang, Barnstorm and the Eagles). He also joined by drummer Joe Vitale, who had a career dating back to the early 1970s.

The song received airplay in the United States on the album-oriented rock radio, and John Entwistle had a 1987 radio interview with Howard Stern about it. It later proved to become Entwistle's highest charting single release, peaking at number 41 on the Billboard Mainstream Rock chart.

Critical reception 
When critic Chris Welch was reviewing the album (available on the 1997 release of the album) he stated (in length) that "'Talk Dirty' is the kind of concept that would get severely criticised by the politically correct. A snappy cowbell rhythm brings in an uptempo raver during which John falls into a kind of Rap, telling his partner that he'd rather talk dirty than discuss the merits of Chopin, Shakespeare or Van Gogh"

Compilation appearances
The song is also on Entwistle's 2005 compilation album, So Who's the Bass Player? The Ox Anthology the version on this album is faster than the release on Too Late the Hero.

Personnel on track
 John Entwistle - Lead Vocals, Bass guitar, 8 string bass guitar, Synthesizers
 Joe Walsh - Lead guitar 
 Joe Vitale - Drums

Charts

References

1981 songs
Atco Records singles
Songs written by John Entwistle